Jeremy Gunn is an English retired association football midfielder who is the head men's soccer coach at Stanford University. He played professionally in the USISL.

Player
Gunn played in both the Grimsby Town F.C. and Scunthorpe United F.C. youth systems in his native England before coming to the United States. He attended Cal State Bakersfield where he was a 1992 First Team NCAA Division II All American soccer player. In 1993, he joined the Chico Rooks of the USISL. In 1998, he moved to the Nashville Metros. On 29 May 1998, the Metros traded Gunn to the Charleston Battery for John Jones and a 1999 draft pick.

Coach
Even while playing professionally, Gunn was also coaching. In 1993, he became an assistant at Cal-State Bakersfield. In 1999, he became the head coach of the Fort Lewis College soccer team. Over eight seasons, he compiled a 123–35–17 record and won six Rocky Mountain Conference championships. He took the Skyhawks to the 1999, 2005 and 2006 NCAA Men's Division II Soccer Championship. The team won in 2005 and finished runner-up in 1999 and 2006. He was the 2005 NCAA Division II Coach of the Year. On 26 December 2006, the Charlotte 49ers hired Gunn to coach the school's men's soccer team. In 2007, he took his team to their first ever Atlantic 10 Tournament championship game. In 2011, Gunn led the 49ers to the finals of the College Cup, where they lost 1–0 to North Carolina. In December 2011, Gunn was hired as the head men's soccer coach at Stanford, leading them to National Championships in 2015, 2016, and 2017.

References

External links
 Charleston Battery: Jeremy Gunn

Charlotte 49ers men's soccer coaches
Chico Rooks players
Charleston Battery players
English footballers
English expatriate footballers
English football managers
Nashville Metros players
USISL players
Living people
USL Second Division players
A-League (1995–2004) players
Cal State Bakersfield Roadrunners men's soccer players
Stanford Cardinal men's soccer coaches
San Jose Earthquakes non-playing staff
Association football midfielders
English expatriate sportspeople in the United States
Expatriate soccer players in the United States
Year of birth missing (living people)